Bradford Roberts is an electrical engineer from S&C Electric Company in Franklin, Wisconsin. He was named a Fellow of the Institute of Electrical and Electronics Engineers (IEEE) in 2014 for his contributions to the uninterruptible power supply industry and battery.

References

Fellow Members of the IEEE
Living people
Year of birth missing (living people)
Place of birth missing (living people)
American electrical engineers